2012 Manx Grand Prix Festival and Races were held between Saturday 18 August and Friday 31 August 2012 on the 37.73-mile Snaefell Mountain Course.

The Blue Riband event of the Manx Grand Prix Festival the 2012 Senior Manx Grand Prix held in damp conditions and rain produced an unexpected win for the Newcomer John Simpson riding a 675 cc Triumph at an average race speed of 106.526 mph. It was the first time the Triumph marque had won the prestigious Senior Manx Grand Prix since Don Crossley victory in the 1948 event at an average race speed of 80.63 mph and also the first Newcomer winner of the Senior Manx Grand Prix since Geoff Duke won the 1949 race at an average speed of 86.063 mph  riding a Norton motor-cycle.   After victory in the Junior Classic Race by Roy Richardson riding a 250 cc Yamaha raised his tally to 10 victories in the Manx Grand Prix Races with Ryan Farquhar also equaling the same total with a win in the Senior Classic Race riding a 500 cc Paton motor-cycle. Held over a reduced race distance of 3 laps the Junior Classic Race was won by Chris Palmer riding a 350 cc Honda and also a first time win in the Lightweight Classic Race for Peter Symes with a 250 cc Suzuki machine. The Junior Manx Grand Prix also produced another first time winner for Wayne Kirwan riding a 600 cc Yamaha motor-cycle after dominating most of the race and along with Nigel Moore in the Super-Twins race with a 650 cc Kawasaki also winning his first Manx Grand Prix. During the Super-Twin Race, while holding 2nd place, Trevor Fergusson crashed fatally at The Nook near to Governor's Bridge on the second lap.

After his father Robert Dunlop won the 1983 Newcomers Junior Manx Grand Prix the 2012 Classic Superbike race was won by Michael Dunlop at an average race speed of 112.545 mph to produce his second win on the Mountain Course during the 2012 racing season after also winning the 2012 Superstock TT race and raising his own tally to three Manx Grand Prix wins. The Newcomers Race was delayed by 1 hour due to weather conditions between the Bungalow and Brandywell produced the first Manx Grand Prix win by a competitor from the Czech Republic when Kamil Holan won the Newcomers Race 'A' at an average race speed of 106.683 mph riding a 600 cc Yamaha motor-cycle.  Taking advantage of local knowledge in the inclement weather conditions on the Mountain section of course, the Isle of Man competitor Andrew Dudgeon won the Newcomers Race 'B' riding a 650 cc Kawasaki Super-Twin machine.  The reintroduced Newcomers Race 'C' produced a win for James Cowton riding a 400 cc Honda motor-cycle.

Difficult weather conditions during Practice Week caused the first Saturday evening to be cancelled due to mist and fog on the Mountain Section of the circuit and also the Clerk of Course not being able to raise the minimum number of race marshals for the event.  Problems with the weather continued on the first Monday evening practice session with the first practice session red flagged after 1 lap and the second Monday evening session the competitors were red-flagged at Parliament Square, Ramsey and then escorted back to the TT Grandstand by Travelling Marshals.  The mixed weather conditions continued during the rest of Manx Grand Practice week and during Wednesday the evening session was red-flagged again to attend to an injured competitor near to Sarah's Cottage.  After the commencement of the Friday evening Practice being delayed by a road traffic accident the session was later abandoned after a fatal accident to Manx Grand Prix newcomer Steve Osborne on Quarterbridge Road.

Results

Practice Times

2012 Senior Manx Grand Prix Practice Times & Leaderboard

 Plates; Black on Yellow.

2012 Junior Manx Grand Prix Practice Times & Leaderboard

 Plates; White numbers on Blue.

2012 Newcomers Race 'A' Practice Times & Leaderboard

 Plates; White Digits on Red Plates.

2012 Newcomers Race 'B' Practice Times & Leaderboard

 Plates; White Digits on Red Plates.

2012 Newcomers Race 'C' Practice Times & Leaderboard

 Plates; White Digits on Red Plates.

2012 350 cc Junior Classic Practice Times and Leaderboard

 Plates; Black digits on White race plates.
 Class A Classic Machines 300 cc–350 cc

2012 250 cc Lightweight Classic Practice Times and Leaderboard

 Plates; Black digits on White race plates.
 Class A Classic Machines 175 cc–250 cc

2012 500 cc Classic Practice Times and Leaderboard

 Plates; White digits on Black race plates.
 Classic Machines 351 cc–500 cc

2012 650 cc Super-Twins Practice Times & Leaderboard

 Plates; White numbers on Green race plates.

2012 Classic Superbike Practice Times & Leaderboard

 Plates; Black Digits on Orange Plates.

2012 Junior Post Classic Practice Times & Leaderboard

 Plates; Black Digits on Orange Plates.

Race Results

Race 1a; Newcomers Race 'A'
Saturday 25 August 2012 Mountain Course 3 laps – 113.00 miles
 Class A
 550 cc–750 cc Four-stroke Four-cylinder motor-cycles.
 651 cc–1000 cc Four-stroke Twin-cylinder motor-cycles.
 601 cc–675 cc Four-stroke Three-cylinder motor-cycles.
 601 cc–1000 cc Rotary motorcycles.

Fastest Lap: John Simpson – 109.808 mph (20' 36.96)

Race 1b; Newcomers Race 'B'
Saturday 25 August 2012 Mountain Course 3 laps – 113.00 miles (182.16 km)
 Class B
 251 cc–450 cc Two-stroke Two-cylinder motor-cycles.
 Up to 650 cc Four-stroke Twin-cylinder motor-cycles.

Fastest Lap: Andrew Dudgeon – 103.580 mph (21' 51.33)

Race 1c; Newcomers Race 'C'
Saturday 25 August 2012 Mountain Course 3 laps – 113.00 miles (182.16 km)
 Class B
 Up to 125 cc Two-stroke Single-cylinder motor-cycles 6 gears maximum.
 201 cc–400 cc Four-stroke Four-cylinder motor-cycles.

Fastest Lap: James Cowton – 99.523 mph (22' 44.79)

Race 2a; 350 cc Junior Classic Race
Tuesday 28 August 2012 Mountain Course 3 laps – 113.00 miles (Reduced Race Distance)
 For motor-cycles exceeding 300 cc and not exceeding 351 cc

Fastest Lap; Roy Richardson 102.327 mph (22 minutes 07.40 secs)

Race 2b; 250 cc Lightweight Classic Race
Tuesday 28 August 2012 Mountain Course 3 laps – 113.00 miles (Reduced Race Distance)
 For motor-cycles exceeding 175 cc and not exceeding 250 cc

Fastest Lap; Peter Symes 93.535 mph (24 minutes 12.16 secs)

Race 3; Junior Manx Grand Prix
Tuesday 28 August 2012 Mountain Course 4 laps – 150.92 miles (242.80 km)
 201 cc–250 cc Two-stroke Two-cylinder motor-cycles.
 550 cc–600 cc Four-stroke Four-cylinder motor-cycles.
 601 cc–675 cc Four-stroke Three-cylinder motor-cycles.
 651 cc–750 cc Four-stroke Two-cylinder motor-cycles.

Fastest Lap; Wayne Kirwan 115.579 mph (19 minutes 35.20 secs)

Race 4; 500 cc Classic Race
Wednesday 29 August 2012 Mountain Course 4 laps – 150.92 miles (242.80 km)
 For classic motor-cycles exceeding 351 cc and not exceeding 500 cc

Fastest Lap: Ryan Farquhar – 106.012 mph (21 minutes 21.25 secs)

Race 4b; Formula Classic Race
Wednesday 29 August 2012 Mountain Course 4 laps – 150.92 miles (242.80 km)
 For motor-cycles exceeding 501 cc and not exceeding 750 cc

Fastest Lap; Dave Madsen-Mygdal 103.606 mph (21 minutes 51.00 secs)

Race 5; Super-Twin Race
Wednesday 29 August 2012 Mountain Course 4 laps – 150.92 miles (242.80 km)
 For motor-cycles exceeding 201 cc and not exceeding 650 cc Two-stroke Twin-cylinder motor-cycles

Fastest Lap: Nigel Moore – 111.746 mph (20 minutes 15.50 secs)

Race 5b; Lightweight Race 
Wednesday 29 August 2012 Mountain Course 4 laps – 150.92 miles (242.80 km)
 Two-stroke motorcycles up to 125 cc, 6 gears maximum.
 Four-stroke motorcycles 251 cc–401 cc

Fastest Lap: Tim Sayers – 105.655 mph (21 minutes 25.58 secs)

Race 6a; Classic Superbike Race
Friday 31 August 2012 Mountain Course 4 laps – 150.92 miles (242.80 km)
 Class A
 Classic Machines 601 cc–1050 cc Four-stroke motorcycles.
 351 cc–750 cc Two-stroke motorcycles.

Fastest Lap; Michael Dunlop 115.560 mph (19 minutes 35.39 secs)

Race 6b; Junior Post Classic Race 
Friday 31 August 2012 Mountain Course 4 laps – 150.92 miles (242.80 km)
 Class B
 126 cc–250 cc Two-stroke Cylinder Grand Prix/Factory Standard motor-cycles/steel-frame or period aluminium.
 251 cc–350 cc Two-stroke Cylinder standard motor-cycles/steel-frame.
 Up to 600 cc Four-stroke Cylinder motorcycles.
 For motorcycles exceeding 175 cc and not exceeding 250 cc

Fastest Lap; Chris Palmer 112.644 mph (20 minutes 05.82 secs)

Race 7; Senior Manx Grand Prix 
Friday 31 August 2012 Mountain Course 4 laps – 150.92 miles (242.80 km)
 Four-stroke Four-cylinder motorcycles exceeding 550 cc and not exceeding 750 cc.
 Four-stroke Twin-cylinder motorcycles exceeding 651 cc and not exceeding 1000 cc.
 Four-stroke Three-cylinder motorcycles exceeding 601 cc and not exceeding 675 cc.

Fastest Lap; Wayne Kirwan 117.189 mph (19 minutes 19.05 secs).

Gallery

Sources

Manx Grand Prix
Manx
Manx Grand Prix
Manx